After independence in 1964, Malta followed a policy of close co-operation with NATO countries. Since 1971, the country sought relations with the rest of the world, including communist countries in Eastern Europe and the non-aligned countries.

After substantially increased financial contributions from several NATO countries (including the United States), the Royal Navy remained in the Malta Dockyard until 1979. Following their departure, Malta charted a new course of neutrality and became an active member of the Non-Aligned Movement. The country joined the Non-Aligned Movement in 1973 as the third European member state after Cyprus and SFR Yugoslavia. Malta is an active participant in the United Nations, the Commonwealth, the Council of Europe, OSCE, and various other international organisations. In these forums, Malta has frequently expressed its concern for the peace and economic development of the Mediterranean region.

On May 1, 2004, Malta withdrew from the Non-Aligned Movement and became a full member of the European Union, with which it had an association agreement since 1971. It was one of ten new members which joined on that date. The Ministry for Foreign Affairs, at Palazzo Parisio, oversees the direction of Maltese foreign policy. The country has close relations with most sovereign countries, with an emphasis on increased trade and foreign direct investment.

Bilateral relations

Africa

Americas

Asia

Europe

Oceania

Malta and the Commonwealth of Nations

Malta has been a member state of the Commonwealth of Nations since 1964, when it became an independent Dominion under the name 'State of Malta'.

Malta became a republic in the Commonwealth of Nations on December 13, 1974, when the last Governor-General of Malta, Sir Anthony Mamo became the first President of Malta.

See also

 List of diplomatic missions in Malta
 List of diplomatic missions of Malta
 Ministry of Foreign Affairs (Malta)

References

External links
Malta Ministry of Foreign Affairs

 
Malta and the Commonwealth of Nations